The Langah Sultanate, also known as the Sultanate of Multan, was a kingdom which emerged after the decline of Delhi Sultanate in the Punjab region. The capital of the Sultanate was the city of Multan in south Punjab.

Origin
There are conflicting reports on the origin of the Langah tribe. Abd al-Haqq, in the 16th century, referred to the Langah as a Baloch tribe.  According to Raverty, Langah rulers were Jats. The tribe is also said to have Rajput origins.

History 
After invasion of Emir Timur in 1398, the Delhi Sultanate became greatly weak and the city of Multan became independent of the Sultanate of Delhi. The inhabitants chose Shaikh Yousaf Qureshi, a descendent of the famous Sufi Baha-ud-din Zakariya, as ruler in 1438. He was a mild and unexperienced ruler. In 1445, Rai Sahra, chief of the Langah attacked the city at night with the help of his tribesmen, arrested Sheikh Yousaf and proclaimed himself Sultan. In this way Multan passed to the Langah clan, thus establishing the Langah Sultanate. The reign of Sultan Husayn I who ruled from 1469 to 1498 is considered to be the most illustrious of the Langah Sultans. Multan experienced prosperity during this time, and a large number of Baloch settlers arrived in the city at the invitation of Shah Husayn. Shah Husayn successfully repulsed attempted invasion by the Delhi Sultans led by Tatar Khan and Barbak Shah.
 He fought off attempts to reinstall Shiekh Yousaf who had taken refuge under Delhi Sultans. Eventually, he signed a peace treaty with Sikander Lodhi and abducted in the favour of his son. His successor, Budhan Khan, who assumed the title Sultan Mahmud Shah I, inherited the Sultanate stretched encompassing the neighbouring regions, including the cities of Chiniot and Shorkot. During the rule of the Langah, a large number of Baloch tribes were allowed to settle in the Derajaat Border in turn for military service.

Decline

Sultan Husayn I being unable to hold his trans-Indus possessions, assigned the region around Dera Ismail Khan to Sardar Malik Sohrab Dodai Baloch in 1469 or 1471 and appointed him as "Jagirdar".
 During the reign of Mahmud Langah, his Vizier rebelled and declared himself independent ruler of Sorkot.
The city was invaded during the reign of Sultan Husseyn II by ruler Shah Husayn of the Arghun dynasty, probably at Babur's insistence. Multan fell in 1528 after an extended siege and Shah Husayn appointed his son Mirza Askari as governor of the city, assisted by Langar Khan, one of the powerful Amirs of Sultan Mahmud Langah I. Shortly after Shah Husayn departed Multan for Thatta, however, the governor was thrown out of the city. The rebels under Sultan Mahmud II administered Multan for a time independently but in 1541, Sher Shah Suri captured Multan, and the Sultanate ended.

Culture
The position of Multan as trans-regional mercantile centre for trade with the Islamic world remained dominant during the Sultanate era. During their reign, Multan became the principle caravan route between Qandahar and Delhi. The extent of Multan's influence is also reflected in the construction of the Multani Caravanserai in Baku, Azerbaijan — which was built in the 15th century to house Multani merchants visiting the city. Legal records from the Uzbek city of Bukhara note that Multani merchants settled and owned land in the city in the late 1550s.

Another important feature of this era was migration of Baloch tribes and their settling in South Punjab. They soon became core of the military  and held political positions in regions like Derajat.

Ministers
Following is the list of known ministers of Langah Sultante:
 Imadul Mulk (1469 -1499), he was Vizier of Husseyn Langah I. He rebelled against him and was imprisoned. 
 Jam Bayzid (1499 - 1503), he was Vizier of Mahmud Langah I. Due to his strained relations with the Sultan, he rebelled and declared himself independent ruler of Sorkot.
 Shuja Bukhari (1503 - 1518), He was Vizier of Mahmud Langah.  
 Langar Khan (1518 -1526), He was last Vizier of Sultanate. He assisted Shah Hussain Arghun to conquer Multan.

Rulers 
 Sultan Qutbudin (Rai Sahra Langah) (1445–1469)
 Sultan Husseyn Langah I (1469–1498)
 Sultan Mahmud I (1498–1518)
 Sultan Husseyn II (1518–1526)
 Sultan Mahmud Langah II (1526-1540)

See also
History of Multan
History of Punjab
Emirate of Multan

References

States and territories established in 1445
States and territories disestablished in 1540
History of Pakistan
History of Punjab, Pakistan